Cârligei may refer to several villages in Romania:

 Cârligei, a village in Bucovăţ Commune, Dolj County
 Cârligei, a village in Bumbești-Pițic Commune, Gorj County

See also 
 Cârlig (disambiguation)
 Cârligi (disambiguation)
 Cârligu River (disambiguation)
 Cârligele River (disambiguation)